Rod Davies (born 17 November 1969) is a Canadian sailor. He competed in the Laser event at the 1996 Summer Olympics.

References

External links
 

1969 births
Living people
Canadian male sailors (sport)
Olympic sailors of Canada
Sailors at the 1996 Summer Olympics – Laser
People from Ajax, Ontario
Sportspeople from Ontario